Bukhtiarabad Domki railway station (Balochi:بختیار آباد ڈومکی ریلوے اسٹیشن ) is  located in Bukhtiarabad Domki town, Nasirabad district of Balochistan province of the Pakistan.

Services
The following trains stop at Bukhtiarabad Domki station:

See also
 List of railway stations in Pakistan
 Pakistan Railways

References

External links

Railway stations in Nasirabad District
Railway stations on Rohri–Chaman Railway Line